The NXT Year-End Awards is a concept used by WWE, where awards, similar to the Academy, Grammy and WWE's own Slammy Awards, are given to professional wrestlers who have competed in NXT in the previous year. There have been five editions of the concept. Fans cast votes online, via Twitter or WWE's website, to decide the winners. Recipients of the award are given a golden ring bell with a hammer.

Starting with the 2019 edition, the NXT Year-End Awards also recognize wrestlers from the NXT UK brand.

Versions

2015 NXT Year-End Awards 
The award winners were announced on the January 13, 2016 episode of NXT via video presentation. Votes were cast through WWE's website.

Winners are listed first and highlighted in boldface.

2016 NXT Year-End Awards 
The award winners were announced on the TakeOver: San Antonio pre-show on January 28, 2017. Votes were cast through Twitter.

Winners are listed first and highlighted in boldface.

2017 NXT Year-End Awards 
The award winners were announced on TakeOver: Philadelphia on January 27, 2018. Votes were cast through Twitter.

Winners are listed first and highlighted in boldface.

Competitors in the match were Abbey Laith, Aliyah, Bianca Belair, Billie Kay, Candice LeRae, Dakota Kai, Lacey Evans, Mercedes Martinez, Nikki Cross, Reina Gonzalez, Rhea Ripley, Sage Beckett, Santana Garrett, Sarah Logan, Taynara Conti, Vanessa Borne and Zeda.

2018 NXT Year-End Awards 
The award winners were announced on the TakeOver: Phoenix pre-show on January 26, 2019. Votes were cast through Twitter.

Winners are listed first and highlighted in boldface.

2019 NXT Year-End Awards 
The award winners were announced on the January 1, 2020 episode of NXT. Votes were cast through Twitter and WWE's website.

Winners are listed first and highlighted in boldface.

2020 NXT Year-End Awards 
The award winners were announced on the December 30, 2020 on WWE.com. Votes were cast through WWE's website.

Winners will be listed first and highlighted in boldface.

Records 
 Most wins – Adam Cole (7)
 Most wins in a single year – Adam Cole (4, 2019)
 Most wins for Female Competitor of the Year – Asuka (2)
 Most wins for Tag Team of the Year (individually) – Kyle O'Reilly (3)
 Most wins for Match of the Year – Johnny Gargano (3)
 Most wins for Rivalry of the Year – Johnny Gargano, Adam Cole (2)
 Most nominations – Johnny Gargano (24)
 Most nominations in a single year – Ricochet (2018) and Adam Cole (2020) (8)
 Most nominations for Overall Competitor of the Year – Asuka (3)
 Most nominations for Female Competitor of the Year – Asuka (3)
 Most nominations for Tag Team of the Year (team) – The Revival (Scott Dawson and Dash Wilder) (3)
 Most nominations for Tag Team of the Year (individually) – Kyle O'Reilly (4)
 Most nominations for Match of the Year – Johnny Gargano (13)
 Most nominations for Match of the Year in a single year – Sasha Banks (2015), Pete Dunne (2018), and Ricochet (2018) (5)
 Most nominations for Rivalry of the Year – Johnny Gargano (6)
 Most nominations for Rivalry of the Year in a single year – Johnny Gargano (3, 2018)
 Most nominations for Breakout Star of the Year – Andrade "Cien" Almas, Lars Sullivan, Rhea Ripley, and Damian Priest (2)
Most nominations for Future Star of NXT – Xia Li (2)
 Event with the most Match of the Year nominations – TakeOver: Toronto (4, 2016)
 Event series with the most TakeOver of the Year wins – TakeOver: WarGames (3)
 Championship with the most Match of the Year wins – NXT Championship (3)
 Championship with the most Match of the Year nominations – NXT Championship (17)
 Championship with the most Match of the Year nominations in a single year – NXT Women's Championship (5, 2015)

See also 
 List of professional wrestling awards

References 

Professional wrestling awards
Awards established in 2015
WWE NXT